Baseco Beach is an urban beach located at Baseco Compound in Port Area, Manila, Philippines. A part of the beach was redeveloped by the city as the Baseco Park, using rehashed materials such as rehabilitated old lamp posts from other parts of the city.

Impact

Health
Despite dangerous levels of coliform in waters adjacent to the beach, Baseco Beach is frequented by some Manila residents.

References

Beaches of Metro Manila
Manila Bay
Manila
Beaches of the Philippines